Jay M. Gambetta is a scientist and executive, leading the team at IBM Thomas J Watson Research Center working to build a quantum computer.

Education
Following his Bachelor of Science and Honours degree at Griffith University in 1999 (gaining four awards, including a University medal), Gambetta began a PhD under the supervision of Howard Wiseman in quantum foundations and non-Markovian open quantum systems. After graduating in 2004, Gambetta turned his research to the then-nascent field of superconducting quantum computing. He gained a post-doctorate post at Yale. In 2007, he moved to the Institute for Quantum Computing in Waterloo, where he worked as a postdoc and gained in 2009 a Junior Fellowship from the Canadian Institute for Advanced Research (CIFAR).

Career
In 2011 he moved to private industry, joining the IBM effort to build a quantum computer based on superconducting qubits. He was appointed Vice President of quantum computing in 2019. As a scientist he has done work on quantum validation techniques, quantum codes, improved gates and coherence, error mitigation and near-term applications of quantum computing. In addition, he was a leader of the team to create the "IBM Quantum Experience", "Qiskit" and the "IBM Q System One".

Gambetta's honours include being elected as a Fellow of the American Physical Society in 2014 and being named an IBM Fellow in 2018.

Honors
 IBM Fellow (2018) 
 Fellow of the American Physical Society (2014)

Gambetta's Law 
The observation that Quantum Volume is doubling every year is called "Gambetta's law."

References 

Living people
Australian physicists
Fellows of the American Physical Society
IBM Fellows
1979 births